Brown Creek is a tributary of the Pee Dee River in south-central North Carolina and north-central South Carolina that drains Chesterfield County, South Carolina, Union County, North Carolina, and Anson County, North Carolina.

Brown Creek rises near the town of the Pageland, South Carolina and flows northeast briefly into Union County and then through Anson County. The creek drains a large portion of the Wadesboro Triassic Basin.

Variant names
According to the Geographic Names Information System, it has also been known historically as:  
Big Brown Creek
Browns Creek

See also
List of North Carolina rivers

References

Rivers of North Carolina
Rivers of Anson County, North Carolina
Rivers of Union County, North Carolina
Rivers of South Carolina
Rivers of Chesterfield County, South Carolina
Tributaries of the Pee Dee River